Un coup de baguette magique is a 1997 French TV movie written and directed by Roger Vadim. It starred Marie-Christine Barrault, Michael York and Sagamore Stévenin. It is a sequel to La Nouvelle tribu (1996).

It was Vadim's last movie.

External links

French television films
1997 television films
1997 films
1990s French films
French comedy-drama films